Horace Walker (1838–1908) was an English mountaineer who made many notable first ascents, including Mount Elbrus and the Grandes Jorasses.

Alpinism
Born in 1838, Walker was the son of Liverpool lead merchant and mountaineer Francis Walker (1808–1872) and brother of Lucy Walker (1836–1916), the first woman to climb the Matterhorn.

Walker was President of the Alpine Club in 1891-1893.

Commemoration
The Horace Walker glacier and Horace Walker hut in the Southern Alps of New Zealand are named after him.

In commemoration of his first ascent of the Grandes Jorasses on 30 June 1868, Walker gives his name to Pointe Walker (4,208 m), the highest summit of the mountain; this lends its name to the Walker Spur, the most well-known buttress on the north face and one of the great north faces of the Alps.

First ascents
Barre des Écrins with A. W. Moore and Edward Whymper, and guides Michel Croz, Christian Almer the elder, and Christian Almer the younger on 25 June 1864 
Balmhorn (Bernese Alps) with Frank Walker and Lucy Walker, and guides Jakob Anderegg and  Melchior Anderegg on 21 July 1864
Piz Roseg (Bernina Alps) with A. W. Moore, and the guide Jakob Anderegg on 28 June 1865

Ober Gabelhorn (Pennine Alps) with A. W. Moore, and Jakob Anderegg on 6 July 1865
Pigne d'Arolla (Pennine Alps) with A. W. Moore, and Jakob Anderegg on 9 July 1865
Brenva Spur on Mont Blanc with George Spencer Mathews, A. W. Moore, Francis Walker, and the guides Jakob Anderegg and Melchior Anderegg on 15 July 1865 
Grandes Jorasses (Mont Blanc Massif) with guides Melchior Anderegg, Johann Jaun and Julien Grange on 30 June 1868
Mount Elbrus (Main West Peak, 5642 m) (Caucasus) with F. Crauford Grove, Frederick Gardner and the guides Peter Knubel of St. Niklaus in the canton Valais and  Ahiya Sottaiev in 1874

References

English mountain climbers
Presidents of the Alpine Club (UK)
1838 births
1908 deaths